Indian Givers: How the Indians of the Americas Transformed the World is a 1988 non-fiction book by American author Jack Weatherford. The book explains the many ways in which the various peoples native to  North and South America contributed to the modern world's culture, manufacturing, medicine, markets, and other aspects of modern life.

Book summary

Jack Weatherford explains how the peoples of the Americas have been forgotten for their contributions to the modern world. He also explains how the Europeans learned how to deal with excess. 

First, he deals with silver, and its relationship to early manufacturing and to capitalism in general, even going so far as to say that capitalism as we know it wouldn't exist without a large mountain that contained as much as 85% of all silver ever found in the Americas. From there, he moves on to the industrial revolution. Saying that without the contributions of Americans (both North and South), many of the things we take for granted would never have happened.

Secondly, he talks about food, in terms of the way the diet of Europeans changed with corn, beans, potatoes, tomatoes, and peppers; in terms of how the food is grown, produced, and preserved; and in terms of the culinary arts.

Thirdly, the author makes the case that the United States Constitution was directly influenced by the Iroquois Confederacy, and that many ideas of the Age of Enlightenment were simply observations of the Pre-Columbian peoples in operation in the "natural state". 

Fourthly, pre-contact peoples mastered the art of medicine and human biology. They had figured out how to use many plants to make medicines, deal with injury, and for other uses, such as making rubber. Indigenous pharmacology was the most advanced in the world, with alkaloids such as quinine well known by Native South Americans ahead of Europeans or other nations. Mind-altering and addictive drugs were heavily regulated by the various societies, being used only for religious purposes. 

Lastly, Indians were great city planners and road builders, with outstanding road networks such as the Qhapaq Ñan, but much of what was built by the Indians was destroyed by the Conquistadors. Finally, the author wonders what has been lost, and gives a brief overview of how the Europeans were so able to conquer the equally advanced civilizations they found on the American continents.

Author
Jack Weatherford is a cultural anthropologist and former Professor of Anthropology at Macalester College in Minnesota.  He received an M.A. in Anthropology in 1973 and a Ph.D in Anthropology from UCSD. He authored Genghis Khan and the Making of the Modern World. In 2006, he was awarded the Order of the Polar Star, Mongolia's highest national honor for foreigners.

See also
 Archaeology of the Americas
 Columbian Exchange
 European colonization of the Americas
 Indigenous peoples of the Americas
 Indian massacres
 Population history of American indigenous peoples

Related books 
 1491: New Revelations of the Americas Before Columbus by Charles C. Mann 
 Before the Revolution: America's Ancient Pasts by Daniel K. Richter

References

1988 non-fiction books
20th-century history books
History of indigenous peoples of North America
Non-fiction books about indigenous peoples of the Americas